Karen Gonzalez Pittman is an American politician serving as a member of the Florida House of Representatives for the 65th district. She assumed office on November 8, 2022.

Education 
Pittman earned a Bachelor of Science degree in elementary education and Master of Education from the University of South Florida.

Career 
Pittman worked as an elementary school teacher in the Hillsborough County Public Schools from 1985 to 1988 and a program evaluator for the Pinellas County Schools from 1990 to 1993. From 1993 to 1997, she worked as an evaluation coordinator for the Hillsborough County Public Schools. Since 2021, she has been the vice president of public affairs for Health Performance Specialists. She was elected to the Florida House of Representatives in November 2022.

Personal life 
Pittman's husband, Christopher Pittman, is an interventional radiologist. The couple has four children.

References 

Living people
Republican Party members of the Florida House of Representatives
People from Hillsborough County, Florida
University of South Florida alumni
Women state legislators in Florida
21st-century American politicians
21st-century American women politicians
Hispanic and Latino American state legislators in Florida
American politicians of Cuban descent
Year of birth missing (living people)